Christopher Robert Ingamells  (9 August 1914 – 27 October 1986) was an Australian politician.

He was born in Westbury. In 1959 he was elected to the Tasmanian House of Assembly as a Liberal member for Wilmot. He served as Speaker from 1969 to 1972. He was defeated in 1976. Ingamells died in Launceston.

References

1914 births
1986 deaths
Liberal Party of Australia members of the Parliament of Tasmania
Members of the Tasmanian House of Assembly
Speakers of the Tasmanian House of Assembly
Officers of the Order of the British Empire
20th-century Australian politicians